The North Island Fault System (also known as North Island Dextral Fault Belt or NIFS) is a set of southwest–northeast trending seismically-active faults in the North Island of New Zealand that carry most of the dextral (right lateral) strike-slip component of the oblique convergence of the Pacific Plate with the Australian Plate.

The faults include the Wairarapa Fault and Wellington Fault to the southwest, the Ruahine and Mohaka Faults in the central section and the Waimana, Waiotahi, Whakatane and Waiohau Faults to the northeast. Most of the fault system consists of dextral strike-slip faults, although towards its northeastern end the trend swings to more S-N trend and the faults become mainly oblique normal in sense as the zone intersects with the Taupo rift zone. This fault zone accommodates up to 10 mm/yr of strike-slip displacement.

Faults
The North Island Fault System consists of eight main fault strands and many smaller related faults.

Mohaka Fault
The more southeasterly branch of the Wellington Fault is known as the Mohaka fault. The fault splays to the north, onto the Waimana Fault, which itself branches into the Waiotahi and Waioeka Faults, the main segment of the Mohaka Fault eventually passes into the Whakatane Fault.

Ruahine Fault
As the Wellington Fault branches near Woodville, the more northwesterly branch is known as the Ruahine Fault. Results from trenching over this fault suggest an earthquake recurrence interval of 400–500 years, with typical offsets in the range 3.0–5.5 m. At its northern end this fault becomes the Waiohau Fault.

Waimana Fault
The Waimana Fault is to the east of the Whakatane Fault both of which join the Mohaka Fault

Waiohau Fault
The Waiohau Fault extends from the end of the Ruahine Fault north towards the Bay of Plenty. It lies roughly parallel with, and to the west of, the Whakatane, Waimana, and Waiotahi Faults, and to the east of the Taupo Rift. At its southern end it is a dextral strike-slip fault, becoming a normal dip-slip fault for the northern part of its length. The valley of the Rangitaiki River approximately follows the line of the fault. The fault is believed to be responsible for an earthquake in 1866 which was centred near Te Mahoe, east of Kawerau.

Wairarapa Fault

The Wairarapa Fault extends from near the coast just southwest of Lake Wairarapa, running along the lake's northwestern edge. The 8.2 Mw 1855 Wairarapa earthquake was caused by movement along this fault. The recurrence interval for large earthquakes on this fault is less than 2,000 years.

Wellington Fault

The Wellington Fault is a dextral strike-slip fault that runs from the Cook Strait on the southern coast of North Island up to near Woodville, where the fault branches into the Mohaka and Ruahine Faults. No historical earthquakes have been recorded along this fault although a significant event is estimated to have occurred within the last 1,000 years. The recurrence interval for large earthquakes on this fault is estimated to be less than 2,000 years. Three main segments have been identified, the Wellington-Hutt section, the Tararua section and the Pahiatua section.

Whakatane Fault
The Whakatane Fault is where the North Island Fault System intersects the Taupo Rift and so displacement across the Whakatane Fault is expected to be oblique, with both normal dip-slip (1.5 ± 0.5 mm/yr) and right-lateral strike-slip (1.1 ± 0.5 mm/yr) components of motion.

References

Seismic faults of New Zealand
Geographic areas of seismological interest
Geology of New Zealand